Amblychilepas platyactis is a species of sea snail, a marine gastropod mollusk in the family Fissurellidae, the keyhole limpets.

Description
The size of this species varies between 11 mm and 25 mm.

Distribution
This marine species occurs off West Cape to East London, South Africa

References

 Steyn, D.G. & Lussi, M. (1998) Marine Shells of South Africa. An Illustrated Collector’s Guide to Beached Shells. Ekogilde Publishers, Hartebeespoort, South Africa, ii + 264 pp. page(s): 12

External links
 
  McLean J.H. & Kilburn R.N. 1986. Propodial elaboration in Southern African and Indian Ocean Fissurellidae (Mollusca: Prosobranchia) with descriptions of two new genera and one new species. Contributions in Science, Natural History Museum of Los Angeles County, 379: 1–12

Fissurellidae
Gastropods described in 1986